Samolaco is a comune (municipality) in the Province of Sondrio in the Italian region Lombardy, located about  north of the regional capital Milan and about  northwest of Sondrio.

The territory of the comune, mostly mountainous, includes of a number of small centres of population, notably Casenda, Era, Giumello, San Pietro and Somaggia. All of these lie in the valley known as the Piano di Chiavenna, just to the north of the small lake Lago di Mezzola, which itself lies to the north of Lake Como. There is no centre called Samolaco, although the community centre, a grocery store, a bank, two bars, a farm supply store and an artisan honey producer lie in the Samolaco area.

Samolaco borders the following municipalities: Gordona, Livo, Montemezzo, Novate Mezzola, Prata Camportaccio, Sorico, Vercana.

Demographic evolution

References

Cities and towns in Lombardy